David Rory Ellison (born 22 October 1980) is an Irish cricketer.  Ellison is a right-handed batsman who bowls right-arm off break.  He was born in Belfast, Northern Ireland.

Ellsion represented the Essex Cricket Board in a single List A match against the Sussex Cricket Board in the 1st round of the 2002 Cheltenham & Gloucester Trophy which was held in 2001.  In his only List A match, he took a single wicket at a cost of 48 runs.

He currently plays club cricket for Woodford Wells Cricket Club in the Essex Premier League.

References

External links
Rory Ellison at Cricinfo
Rory Ellison at CricketArchive

1980 births
Living people
Cricketers from Belfast
People from County Antrim
Irish cricketers
Essex Cricket Board cricketers
Cricketers from Northern Ireland